Snow sculpture or snow art is a sculpture form comparable to sand sculpture or ice sculpture in that most of it is now practiced outdoors, and often in full view of spectators, thus giving it kinship to performance art in the eyes of some. The materials and the tools differ widely, but often include hand tools such as shovels, hatchets, and saws. The snow is densely packed into a form after having been produced by artificial means or collected from the ground after a snowfall.

Events

There are a number of international ice and snow sculpting events around the world.

Canada
Since 1973 there has been an international snow sculpture contest during the Quebec City Winter Carnival and more recently the Winterlude celebrations (in Ottawa) have had snow sculpture events.

China
Harbin International Ice and Snow Sculpture Festival originated in Harbin's traditional ice lantern show and garden party that takes place in winter, which began in 1963 in Heilongjiang, China. It was interrupted for a number of years during the Cultural Revolution, but has been resumed and was announced as an annual event at Zhaolin Park on January 5 in 1985.

United States

The Saint Paul Winter Carnival which hosts snow and ice carving competitions is the oldest annual winter carnival in the world, with the first one being held in 1886.

The annual Winter Carnival at Michigan Technological University has been a tradition since 1922. These sculptures are not carved from a single block, but rather many blocks made over a month. For this reason, they can grow quite large (Up to the regulated 28 feet tall and sometimes over 80–123 feet long).  Each year a theme is given for the winter carnival and the statues are created in the set theme.  Student groups compete against each other in different divisions. Many U.S. states hold their own competitions with a national event being held in Lake Geneva, Wisconsin each year. 

Frankenmuth, Michigan hosts a massive snow and ice sculpture festival in late January with teams traveling to carve from all over the globe. Frankenmuth's Snowfest consists of many ice carving competitions and snow sculpting competitions at elementary, high school, state, national, and international levels.

The Breckenridge International Snow Sculpture Championships in Breckenridge, Colorado began in 1990.  A group of local snow sculptors called Team Breck, which was part of the Colorado State Snow Sculpture Championships held in Breckenridge, joined with the city and Breckenridge Ski Resort to begin an annual competition.  In 2009 teams from China, Spain, the Netherlands and other countries competed.  The winner was Team Canada - Yukon, led by sculptor Donald Watt.

See also
Snowman
Ice sculpture
Michigan Technological University's Winter Carnival
La statue de la Résistance

External links

Quebec City Winter Carnival Official Website 
Michigan Tech Winter Carnival
United States National Snow Sculpting Competition
Official Sapporo Snow Festival site (English)

 
Buildings and structures made of snow or ice
Outdoor sculptures
Sculpture techniques